Michael Polzin (born 23 June 1964) is an Australian cricketer. He played in fifteen first-class and fourteen List A matches for Queensland between 1986 and 1992.

See also
 List of Queensland first-class cricketers

References

External links
 

1964 births
Living people
Australian cricketers
Queensland cricketers
Cricketers from Queensland